Farrell Funston was a Canadian Football League wide receiver for the Winnipeg Blue Bombers for eight years. He won three Grey Cup titles with the team.

CFL career
After playing college football at Pacific University and being drafted by the National Football League without playing a down, Funston became a wide receiver for the Winnipeg Blue Bombers from 1959 to 1966. For all those years, Ken Ploen was his quarterback. Together, they were major factors in Winnipeg's four Grey Cup appearances (1959, 1961, 1962, 1965), including three victories: 1959, 1961, 1962, and one loss: 1965. His highest totals as a receiver were the two years he was voted as a western conference all-star: 1961 (47 catches for 892 yards, 19.0 yards per catch, 8 touchdowns) and 1963 (60 catches for 835 yards, 13.9 yards per catch, 9 touchdowns).

Video clips

See also

 List of Grey Cup champions
 List of people from Los Angeles

References

1936 births
1996 deaths
American players of Canadian football
Canadian football wide receivers
Pacific Boxers football players
Players of American football from Los Angeles
Winnipeg Blue Bombers players